In theoretical physics, 3D mirror symmetry is a version of mirror symmetry in 3-dimensional gauge theories with N=4 supersymmetry, or 8 supercharges. It was first proposed by Kenneth Intriligator and Nathan Seiberg, in their 1996 paper "Mirror symmetry in three-dimensional gauge theories", as a relation between pairs of 3-dimensional gauge theories, such that the Coulomb branch of the moduli space of one is the Higgs branch of the moduli space of the other.  It was demonstrated using D-brane cartoons by Amihay Hanany and Edward Witten 4 months later, where they found that it is a consequence of S-duality in type IIB string theory.

Four months later 3D mirror symmetry was extended to N=2 gauge theories resulting from supersymmetry breaking in N=4 theories.  Here it was given a physical interpretation in terms of vortices. In 3-dimensional gauge theories, vortices are particles. BPS vortices, which are those vortices that preserve some supersymmetry, have masses which are given by the FI term of the gauge theory. In particular, on the Higgs branch, where the squarks are massless and condense yielding nontrivial vacuum expectation values (VEVs), the vortices are massive. On the other hand, Intriligator and Seiberg interpret the Coulomb branch of the gauge theory, where the scalar in the vector multiplet has a VEV, as being the regime where massless vortices condense. Thus the duality between the Coulomb branch in one theory and the Higgs branch in the dual theory is the duality between squarks and vortices.

In this theory, the instantons are 't Hooft–Polyakov magnetic monopoles whose actions are proportional to the VEV of the scalar in the vector multiplet. In this case, instanton calculations again reproduce the nonperturbative super potential.  In particular, in the N=4 case with SU(2) gauge symmetry, the metric on the moduli space was found by Nathan Seiberg and Edward Witten using holomorphy and supersymmetric nonrenormalization theorems several days before Intriligator and Seiberg's 3-dimensional mirror symmetry paper appeared. Their results were reproduced using standard instanton techniques.

Notes

Symmetry